The Matron Stakes is a Victoria Racing Club Group 3 Australian Thoroughbred horse race held under set weight conditions with penalties, for fillies and mares aged three years old and upwards, over a distance of 1600 metres at Flemington Racecourse in Melbourne, Australia in March during the VRC Autumn Racing Carnival. Total Prize money is A$200,000.

History
The race has had changes in grade and name. In 2007 the race was run at Sandown Racecourse.

Grade
 1994–2005 - Listed Race
 2006 onwards - Group 3

Race names 
 1994–2008 - Matron Stakes
 2009 -  Patinack Farm Stakes
 2011 onwards - Schweppervescence Trophy

The Schweppervescence Trophy from 2006–2010 was the race name for the registered race Frances Tressady Stakes.

Distance
 1994 – 1616 metres
 1995 – 1623 metres
 1996 – 1600 metres
 1997 – 1617 metres
 1998 – 1635 metres
 1999 – 1606 metres
 2000 onwards - 1600 metres

Winners

 2023 - Sirileo Miss
 2022 - Flying Mascot
 2021 - Sovereign Award
 2020 - Paint The Town Two
 2019 - Spanish Reef
 2018 - Spanish Reef
 2017 - Circular
 2016 - Felicienne
 2015 - Noble Protector
 2014 - Bonaria
 2013 - Bonaria
 2012 - Spirit Song
 2011 - Pinker Pinker
 2010 - Response
 2009 - Fifth Avenue Lady
 2008 - Translate
 2007 - Like It Is
 2006 - Umber
 2005  -  Uprize
 2004  -  Ruling Eyes
 2003  -  Lady Knockout
 2002  -  La Zoffany
 2001  -  Lady Marion          
 2000  -  Dance The Night      
 1999  -  Noircir              
 1998  -  Miss Tessla          
 1997  -  French Resort        
 1996  -  Jadeva Belle         
 1995  -  Aunty Mary           
 1994  -  Excited Angel

See also
 List of Australian Group races
 Group races

References

Horse races in Australia
Flemington Racecourse
Sprint category horse races for fillies and mares
Recurring sporting events established in 1994
1994 establishments in Australia